The term carboxypeptidase P may refer to:

 Lysosomal Pro-X carboxypeptidase
 Membrane Pro-X carboxypeptidase